Fernando Andrés Núñez (born 22 July 1995) is an Argentine professional footballer who plays as a forward for Argentino Monte Maíz.

Career
Núñez started his youth career with Club Leonardo Murialdo, before being signed by Godoy Cruz. He was promoted into the first-team of Argentine Primera División side Godoy Cruz in 2017. He featured four times throughout the 2016–17 league season, but his professional debut arrived in the Copa Libertadores during May 2017 in a home draw against Libertad. He played once more in the Copa Libertadores, versus Atlético Mineiro on 16 May, prior to making his league bow in a win over Vélez Sarsfield on 21 May. Núñez spent 2019–20 on loan with Sarmiento; scoring twice, versus Chacarita Juniors and All Boys, in eleven games.

In October 2020, Núñez moved to Tornero Argentino A club Huracán LH. In March 2022, he joined fellow league club Argentino Monte Maíz.

Career statistics
.

References

External links

1995 births
Living people
Sportspeople from Mendoza Province
Argentine footballers
Association football forwards
Argentine Primera División players
Primera Nacional players
Godoy Cruz Antonio Tomba footballers
Club Atlético Sarmiento footballers